The Madonnina is a statue of the Virgin Mary atop Milan Cathedral in Italy.

At the top of the spire is the polychrome Madonnina statue, designed and built by Carlo Pellicani in 1774, during the episcopacy of Giuseppe Pozzobonelli who supported the idea to place the Madonnina at the top of the Cathedral.
By tradition, no building in Milan is higher than the Madonnina.

The Madonnina is the subject of the most traditional Milanese song, O mia bella Madonnina. The Derby della Madonnina named after it is the local rivalry between the city's two football clubs A.C. Milan and Inter Milan.

See also
Terra Sancta College (Jerusalem), with a replica of the Madonnina ocrowning the facade

Notes

Culture in Milan
Outdoor sculptures in Milan
1774 sculptures
Monuments and memorials in Milan
Sculptures of women in Italy
Statues in Italy